"The Time of Our Lives" is a song recorded by multinational operatic pop quartet Il Divo and American singer Toni Braxton to serve as the official song of the 2006 FIFA World Cup held in Germany. Written by Jörgen Elofsson and produced by Steve Mac, the song appears on the compilation album Voices from the FIFA World Cup (2006) and on the 2006 European reissue of Braxton's fifth studio album, Libra.

Il Divo and Braxton performed "The Time of Our Lives" during the 2006 FIFA World Cup opening festivities at Allianz Arena in Munich on 9 June 2006. That same day it was released as a single in continental Europe, reaching the top 10 in Switzerland, the top 20 in Germany and Norway, and the top 30 in Italy and Austria, as well as number 52 on the European Hot 100 Singles chart.

Music video
The single's music video, directed by Nigel Dick, takes place on a football field at night; the Il Divo members are standing on the turf while Braxton is seen on a screen. It is intercut with scenes from FIFA World Cup matches over the years.

Track listings
European CD single
"The Time of Our Lives" (radio edit) – 3:17
"Isabel" – 4:14

European CD maxi single
"The Time of Our Lives" (radio edit) – 3:17
"Isabel" – 4:14
"The Time of Our Lives" (original version) – 4:39
"Heroe" – 4:17
"The Time of Our Lives" (video) - 5:07

Personnel

Musicians
Il Divo – vocals
Toni Braxton – vocals
Steve Mac – keyboards
Dave Arch – piano
Friðrik "Frissy" Karlsson – guitar
Chris Laws – drums
Isobel Griffiths – orchestra fixer
Gavyn Wright – orchestra leader
John Baker – copyist

Technical
Steve Mac – producer, arranger
Chris Laws – engineer, Pro Tools operator
Dan Pursey – assistant engineer
Ren Swan – mix engineer
Dave Arch – string arrangements
Geoff Foster – string engineer
Jake Jackson – assistant
Braddon Williams – engineer
Keri Lewis – vocal producer for Toni Braxton
Dave Russell – vocal engineer for Toni Braxton
Dick Beetham – mastering

Charts

References

2000s ballads
2006 singles
2006 songs
FIFA World Cup official songs and anthems
Il Divo songs
Music videos directed by Nigel Dick
Pop ballads
Song recordings produced by Steve Mac
Songs written by Jörgen Elofsson
Sony BMG singles
Syco Music singles
Toni Braxton songs